Voice of Chunk is a 1988 album by jazz band The Lounge Lizards.  

The album was produced independently by bandleader John Lurie, following two releases with Island Records. After unsuccessfully shopping the album to several record labels, Lurie decided to hire a company to print copies of Voice of Chunk and sell it himself through mail-order, promoted with advertisements on television. He reports the album sold about 30,000 copies, a substantial sum for an independent jazz album, but promotional and sales costs were higher than anticipated so the album was not financially profitable. Voice of Chunk was later re-released on frontman John Lurie's record label Strange and Beautiful Music.

The song "Uncle Jerry" was a tribute to Lurie's paternal uncle.

Track listing
All tracks composed by John Lurie; except where indicated
"Bob The Bob" 
"Voice of Chunk"  (John Lurie, Erik Sanko)
"One Big Yes" 
"The Hanging" 
"Uncle Jerry"  (John Lurie, Erik Sanko)
"A Paper Bag and the Sun"  (John Lurie, Dougie Bowne, Marc Ribot)
"Tarantella"  (music: Evan Lurie; lyrics: The Lounge Lizards)
"Bob The Bob Home" 
"Sharks" 
"Travel"  (Evan Lurie)

Personnel
John Lurie - alto and soprano saxophone
Evan Lurie - piano
Marc Ribot - guitar, trumpet
Curtis Fowlkes - trombone
Roy Nathanson - alto and tenor saxophone
E.J. Rodriguez - percussion
Erik Sanko - bass
Dougie Bowne - drums

References

1988 albums
The Lounge Lizards albums